Organizations designated as terrorist by Canada are groups that have been listed by the Canadian government as terrorist organisations.

Since 18 December 2001, the Anti-terrorism Act has allowed for section 83.05 of the Canadian Criminal Code to be invoked by the Governor in Council to maintain a list of "entities" that are engaged in terrorism, facilitating it, or acting on behalf of such an entity.

Matters relevant to overall counterterrorism and national security within the Government of Canada fall under the jurisdiction of the Minister of Public Safety and Emergency Preparedness. A review is conducted by the minister every five years to determine whether an entity should remain listed. Entities may apply for a judicial review by the Chief Justice of the Federal Court. Both ministerial and judicial reviews are published in the Canada Gazette. The list is also published on the website of Public Safety Canada.

List

Active

Former

 People's Mujahedin of Iran (listed in 2005, removed in 2012)

See also 
 Terrorism in Canada
 List of designated terrorist groups

References 

 
Terrorism in Canada
Terrorism-related lists